A Natural Woman may refer to:

 "(You Make Me Feel Like) A Natural Woman", a 1967 song by Aretha Franklin
 A Natural Woman (album), a 1969 album by Peggy Lee
 A Natural Woman (book), a 2012 memoir by Carole King